Aquatic insects or water insects live some portion of their life cycle in the water. They feed in the same ways as other insects. Some diving insects, such as predatory diving beetles, can hunt for food underwater where land-living insects cannot compete.

Breathing
One problem that aquatic insects must overcome is how to get oxygen while they are under water. Almost all animals require a source of oxygen to live. Insects draw air into their bodies through spiracles, holes found along the sides of the abdomen. These spiracles are connected to tracheal tubes where oxygen can be absorbed. All aquatic insects have become adapted to their environment with the specialization of these structures
Aquatic adaptations
 Simple diffusion over a relatively thin integument
 Temporary use of an air bubble
 Extraction of oxygen from water using a plastron or blood gill 
 Storage of oxygen in hemoglobin and hemocyanin molecules in hemolymph
 Taking oxygen from surface via breathing tubes (siphons)

The nymphs of the hemimetabolous orders mayflies, dragonflies and stoneflies, and the larvae of the holometabolous orders megalopterans and caddisflies, possess tracheal gills, which are outgrowths of the body wall containing a dense network of tracheae covered by a thin cuticle through which oxygen in the water can diffuse. 

Some insects have densely packed hairs (setae) around the spiracles that allow air to remain near, while keeping water away from, the body. The trachea open through spiracles into this air film, allowing access to oxygen. In many such cases, when the insect dives into the water, it carries a layer of air over parts of its surface, and breathes using this trapped air bubble until it is depleted, then returns to the surface to repeat the process. Other types of insects have a plastron or physical gill that can be various combinations of hairs, scales, and undulations projecting from the cuticle, which hold a thin layer of air along the outer surface of the body. In these insects, the volume of the film is small enough, and their respiration slow enough, that diffusion from the surrounding water is enough to replenish the oxygen in the pocket of air as fast as it is used. The large proportion of nitrogen in the air dissolves in water slowly and maintains the gas volume, supporting oxygen diffusion. Insects of this type only rarely need to replenish their supply of air. 

Other aquatic insects can remain under water for long periods due to high concentrations of hemoglobin in their hemolymph circulating freely within their body. Hemoglobin bonds strongly to oxygen molecules. 

A few insects such as water scorpions and mosquito larvae have breathing tubes ("siphons") with the opening surrounded by hydrofuge hairs, allowing them to breathe without having to leave the water.

Orders with aquatic or semiaquatic species
Collembola - springtails (which are not technically insects, but are closely related)
Ephemeroptera - mayflies
Odonata - dragonflies and damselflies
Plecoptera - stoneflies
Megaloptera - alderflies, fishflies, and dobsonflies
Neuroptera - lacewings
Coleoptera - beetles
Hemiptera - true bugs (water striders, giant water bugs)
Hymenoptera - ants (e.g. Polyrhachis sokolova) and wasps (e.g.Microgaster godzilla)
Diptera - flies and mosquitoes
Mecoptera - scorpionflies
Lepidoptera - moths
Trichoptera - caddisflies

EPT insects, an acronym for Ephemeroptera, Plecoptera and Trichoptera (mayflies, stoneflies and caddisflies), are sensitive to pollutants and are used as an indicator of water quality in streams, rivers and lakes.

Marine aquatic insects 
The aquatic insects live mostly in freshwater habitats since there are very few marine insect species. The only true example of such insects are the sea skaters, which belongs to the Hemiptera order.

References 
 

 Farb, P. (1962). The Water Dwellers [LIFE]INSECTS pg. 142.
 Meyer, J.R. (2006), "Respiration in Aquatic Insects".  (Accessed 25 April 2008)
  

 Wigglesworth, Vincent B. Sir (1964). The life of insects. Weidenfeld & Nicolson, London

External links 
Insect stages - "Some larvae, nymphs and adult insects that live in freshwater." A UK-based web site with microscopic photos of various insects and other microorganisms as well as biological information.